Air Commodore Ibrahim Alkali was a Military Governor of Kwara State from October 1987 to December 1989 during the military regime of Major General Ibrahim Babangida.
He attended Barewa College, Zaria.

He holds the traditional title of Turakin Fika. He was also honoured with the traditional title of Shettima of Igbaja Land by Oba Ahmed Awuni Arepo the third.

References

Nigerian Air Force officers
1940 births
Living people
Governors of Kwara State